Arcos or ARCOS can refer to:

Places

Brazil
 Arcos, Minas Gerais, in Brazil

Portugal
 Arcos de Valdevez, a municipality in the Viana do Castelo District
 Arcos (Anadia), a civil parish in the municipality of Anadia
 Arcos (Braga), a civil parish in the municipality of Braga
 Arcos (Estremoz), a civil parish in the municipality of Estremoz
 Arcos (Ponte de Lima), a civil parish in the municipality of Ponte de Lima
 Arcos (Tabuaço), a civil parish in the municipality of Tabuaço
 Arcos (Vila do Conde), a civil parish in the municipality of Vila do Conde

Spain
 Taifa of Arcos, a medieval kingdom in what is now southern Spain
 Arcos de la Frontera, a town in Andalusia, Spain
 Arcos de las Salinas, a town in Aragon, Spain
 Arcos (Madrid), a ward in the district of San Blas-Canillejas, in the city of Madrid
 Arcobrica, old name for Arcos de la Frontera

Other
Arcos (fish), a genus of clingfishes
 ARCOS, the All Russian Co-operative Society, a purchasing agency of the Soviet Russian government in Britain during the 1920s
ARCOS LLC, a software system for the utility industry
ARCOS-1, fiber optic cable system
 Agustín Gómez-Arcos, a Spanish writer